Oral florid papillomatosis is a condition characterized by a white mass resembling a cauliflower covering the tongue and extending onto other portions of the mucous membranes.  This is a type of verrucous carcinoma.

See also 
 Mucous membrane
 Erythroplakia
 Proliferative verrucous leukoplakia
 List of cutaneous conditions
 List of verrucous carcinoma subtypes

References

External links 

Conditions of the mucous membranes
Oral mucosal pathology